Atsuko Okatsuka  is an American stand-up comedian, actress, and writer based in Los Angeles, California. She was named one of Variety's "Top 10 Comics to Watch" in 2022. She started the viral #Dropchallenge with her grandmother.

Early life and family
Atsuko was born in Taiwan to Japanese and Taiwanese parents, and spent her childhood in Japan. At age ten, she moved to the United States with her mother and grandmother and lived undocumented for seven years.

Career
She co-founded Dis/orient/ed Comedy, the U.S.'s first ever Asian American, mostly-women stand up tour with Jenny Yang and Yola Lu in 2012. The tour debuted at the historic David Henry Hwang Theater in Little Tokyo, Los Angeles.

In 2020, Atsuko released her debut album with Comedy Dynamics, But I Control Me. She hosted and executive produced Let's Go Atsuko, for the now defunct Quibi. Paste said that her comedy style "has a childlike quality to it, with stage persona informed by a complex and challenging upbringing."

Okatsuka notably performed a stand-up set during an earthquake at The Ice House comedy club in Pasadena, California, in 2019 which went viral. She was commended for keeping the audience calm and serving quick-witted jokes while the earthquake went on.

She made her late-night debut on The Late Late Show with James Corden on November 1, 2021 which was praised by Vulture which said it "won late night" the week that it aired.

Atsuko taught Chelsea Handler and Guillermo Rodriguez how to do her Drop Challenge as a guest on Jimmy Kimmel Live! in 2022.

In September 2022, Atsuko performed alongside Joel Kim Booster and Freya Fox at Life is Beautiful 2022.

On December 10, 2022 Atsuko's debut stand-up special The Intruder premiered on HBO and HBO Max, which The New York Times named Best Debut of 2022, and Vulture listed as one of the Best Comedy Specials of 2022.

Personal life
Okatsuka is married to Ryan Harper Gray.

Filmography

As writer
 2018 – Soft Focus with Jena Friedman

Albums
 2020 – But I Control Me

Podcasts
 Why Won't You Date Me?, herself
 Trusty Hogs, herself
 Yo, Is This Racist?, herself
 Hollywood Handbook, herself
 The Margaret Cho, herself
 Natch Beaut, herself
 Sloppy Seconds, herself
 Alison Rosen Is Your New Best Friend, herself
 The Bechdel Cast, herself
 Pep Talks, herself
 Go Fact Yourself, herself
 I Said No Gifts, herself
 Don't Ask Tig, herself
 WTF with Marc Maron, herself
 Mike Birbiglia's Working It Out, herself
 Lovett or Leave It, herself
 Wait Wait... Don't Tell Me!, herself
 The Three Questions with Andy Richter, herself
 Busy Phillips Is Doing Her Best, herself
 Office Hours Live with Tim Heidecker, herself

References

External links
 
 

Living people
Taiwanese comedians
American women comedians
American stand-up comedians
American comedians of Asian descent
American film actresses
American women podcasters
American podcasters
21st-century American women
Place of birth missing (living people)
1988 births
American people of Taiwanese descent
American people of Japanese descent